Johnny Rozsa is a New York-based photographer, specializing in fashion, portrait, and celebrity photography.

Early life
Rozsa was born and raised in Nairobi, the son of Jewish Hungarian-Czech parents.  In the early 1960s he moved to England, where he attended Repton, graduating in 1967.

Training and career
Rozsa studied architecture, painting, and communications at Manchester College of Art and Design, and communications at Polytechnic of Central London. Afterwards, he interned at Vogue. He later ran a vintage shop called Nostalgia in Covent Garden, where he met fashion editors, models, actors, and photographers on a daily basis.

In the late 1970s Rozsa began his photography career, working in Nairobi, London, and the U.S. By 1978, he had a series of four full-page celebrity portraits in Ritz, with accompanying interviews.

Rozsa has photographed celebrities such as Hugh Grant, Halle Berry, Nicolas Cage, John Malkovich, and Natasha Richardson since the late 1970s.  His photographs have appeared in numerous publications, including Vogue, the Sunday Times, The Observer, BLITZ, i-D, Maxim, The Face, The New York Times, and People. His portraits of Ian Charleson, Sade, Marilyn, and Martin Degville are part of the permanent collection at the National Portrait Gallery in London. His photographs of Leigh Bowery have been exhibited in several museums, including the Museum of Contemporary Art in Sydney, the Kunsthalle in Vienna, and the Kunstverein in Hanover. Rozsa has also exhibited at the Venice Biennale.

Untouched
In 2010 Rozsa published a book, Untouched, featuring unretouched photos of 115 now world-famous celebrities, from their days before airbrushing, PhotoShop, digital cameras and enhancements, cosmetic surgery, and perfect images. The book has a foreword by Susan Sarandon, and launched at Barneys in New York City.<ref>Kaufman, Hayley Elisabeth. [https://web.archive.org/web/20090625015517/https://pipeline.refinery29.com/news/sneak_peek_halle_winona_and_ti.php "Sneak Peak! Pre-Fame Pics of Halle, Winona, and Tilda in New Book Untouched."] Refinery29.com. June 19, 2009.</ref>

Personal life
Rozsa was introduced to Buddhism by Tina Turner in 1982, and has been a Nichiren Buddhist since then. He lives in New York City.

Bibliography
Rozsa, Johnny. Untouched''. Glitterati, 2010.

References

External links
Slideshow of Rozsa's photographs

Fashion photographers
Commercial photographers
American portrait photographers
Photographers from New York City
Photographers from New York (state)
People educated at Repton School
Alumni of the University of Manchester
Alumni of the University of Westminster
American people of Czech-Jewish descent
American people of Hungarian-Jewish descent
People from Nairobi
Kenyan expatriates in the United States
Kenyan Jews
Kenyan people of Czech descent
Kenyan people of Hungarian descent
British emigrants to the United States
Living people
Year of birth missing (living people)